István Nyúl (born February 25, 1961) is a Hungarian footballer who played as a forward.

Club career
He played for FC Seoul of the South Korean K League, then known as the Lucky-Goldstar Hwangso.

References

External links
 
 István Nyúl Profile at Magyarfutball.hu
 Photograph at Lucky-Goldstar Hwangso

1961 births
Living people
Hungarian footballers
Hungarian expatriate footballers
Association football forwards
Vasas SC players
K League 1 players
FC Seoul players
Hungarian expatriate sportspeople in South Korea
Expatriate footballers in South Korea